33rd London Film Critics Circle Awards
20 January 2013

Film of the Year: 
 Amour 

British Film of the Year: 
 Berberian Sound Studio 

The 33rd London Film Critics' Circle Awards, honouring the best in film for 2012, were announced by the London Film Critics' Circle on 20 January 2013.

Winners and nominees

Film of the Year
Amour
Argo
Beasts of the Southern Wild
Life of Pi
The Master

British Film of the Year
Berberian Sound Studio
The Imposter
Les Misérables
Sightseers
Skyfall

Foreign Language Film of the Year
Rust and Bone • France/ChinaAmour • Austria/France/Germany
Holy Motors • France/Germany
Once Upon a Time in Anatolia • Turkey/Bosnia and Herzegovina
Tabu • Portugal

Documentary of the YearThe Imposter
London: The Modern Babylon
Nostalgia for the Light
The Queen of Versailles
Searching for Sugar Man

Director of the Year
Ang Lee - Life of Pi
Paul Thomas Anderson - The Master
Kathryn Bigelow - Zero Dark Thirty
Nuri Bilge Ceylan - Once Upon a Time in Anatolia
Michael Haneke - Amour

Screenwriter of the Year
Michael Haneke - Amour
Chris Terrio - Argo
Quentin Tarantino - Django Unchained
Paul Thomas Anderson - The Master
Mark Boal - Zero Dark Thirty

Breakthrough British Filmmaker
Alice Lowe and Steve Oram - Sightseers
Ben Drew - Ill Manors
Sally El Hosaini - My Brother the Devil
Dexter Fletcher - Wild Bill
Bart Layton - The Imposter

Actor of the Year
Joaquin Phoenix - The Master
Daniel Day-Lewis - Lincoln
Hugh Jackman - Les Misérables
Mads Mikkelsen - The Hunt
Jean-Louis Trintignant - Amour
.......................................................................

Actress of the Year
Emmanuelle Riva - Amour
Jessica Chastain - Zero Dark Thirty
Marion Cotillard - Rust and Bone
Helen Hunt - The Sessions
Jennifer Lawrence - Silver Linings Playbook

Supporting Actor of the Year
Philip Seymour Hoffman - The Master
Alan Arkin - Argo
Javier Bardem - Skyfall
Michael Fassbender - Prometheus
Tommy Lee Jones - Lincoln

Supporting Actress of the Year
Anne Hathaway - Les Misérables
Amy Adams - The Master
Judi Dench - Skyfall
Sally Field - Lincoln
Isabelle Huppert - Amour

British Actor of the Year
Toby Jones - Berberian Sound Studio
Daniel Craig - Skyfall
Charlie Creed-Miles - Wild Bill
Daniel Day-Lewis - Lincoln
Steve Oram - Sightseers

British Actress of the Year
Andrea Riseborough - Shadow Dancer
Emily Blunt - Looper and Your Sister's Sister
Judi Dench - The Best Exotic Marigold Hotel and Skyfall
Alice Lowe - Sightseers
Helen Mirren - Hitchcock

Young British Performer of the Year
Tom Holland - The Impossible
Samantha Barks - Les Misérables
Jack Reynor - What Richard Did

Technical Achievement
Life of Pi - Bill Westenhofer, visual effects
Anna Karenina - Jacqueline Durran, costumes
Argo - William Goldenberg, film editing
Beasts of the Southern Wild - Ben Richardson, cinematography
Berberian Sound Studio - Joakim Sundström and Stevie Haywood, sound design
Holy Motors - Bernard Floch, make-up
Life of Pi - Claudio Miranda, cinematography
The Master - Jack Fisk and David Crank, production design
My Brother the Devil - David Raedeker, cinematography
Rust and Bone - Alexandre Desplat, music

Dilys Powell Award
Helena Bonham Carter

References

External links
Official Critics' Circle nomination press release

2
2012 film awards
2012 in British cinema
2012 in London